The Indonesia women's national football team represents Indonesia in international women's football, and is controlled by the Football Association of Indonesia (PSSI). Despite football being one of the nation's favorite sports, Indonesia is not among the strongest teams in the AFC, especially its women's side. Indonesia has no tradition for women's football and considerably underdeveloped, in contrast with the men's side.

History
Indonesia has participated in five AFC Women's Asian Cup, formerly known as the AFC Women's Championship. They finished as high as fourth in 1977 and 1986.

In 2021, Indonesia qualified for the 2022 AFC Women's Asian Cup for the first time since 1989, after absence for 33 years.

FIFA World Ranking
, after the match against .

 Best Ranking   Best Mover   Worst Ranking   Worst Mover

Results and fixtures

Matches in the last 12 months, and future scheduled matches

Legend

2022

2023

Head-to-head record

Below is a list of matches detailing Indonesia's matches against FIFA-recognized teams.

Coaches

Current coaching staff

Manager history
Updated on 26 February 2023, after the match against .

Players

Current squad

The following players were called up for the friendly matches against  on 22 & 26 February 2023.

Caps and goals are corrected as of 26 February 2022 against .

Recent call-ups 
The following players have also been called up to the squad within the last 12 months.

Notes
PRE = Preliminary squad
SUS = Suspended
INJ = Withdrew from the roster due to an injury
UNF = Withdrew from the roster due to unfit condition
RET = Retired from the national team
WD = Withdrew from the roster for non-injury related reasons

Previous squads 

 AFC Women's Asian Cup
 2022 AFC Women's Asian Cup squads

 Asian Games
 2018 Asian Games squads

 AFF Championship
 2022 AFF Women's Championship squads
 2018 AFF Women's Championship squads
 2015 AFF Women's Championship squads
 2013 AFF Women's Championship squads

 Southeast Asian Games
 2019 Southeast Asian Games squads

Notable players

 Lantang (1977)
 Papat Yunisal (1980–1989)
 Dorce Upuya (1981)
 Yuri Maryati (1982–1986)
 Tiktik (1985)
 Atmini (1985–1986)
 Elan Kaligis (1986)
 Iin Parbo (1986)
 Rosita Pella (1986)
 Rukijah (1986)
 Titas Susiana (1986)
 Nelce Libak (1989)
 Gusriwati (2001–2005)
 Jenny Merlin Yansip (2001–2005)
 Marion Pakage (2001–2005)
 Yakomina Swabra (2001–2005)
 Wiwin Yuniggishi (2004)
 Tugiyati Cindy (2011–2013)

Competitive record

FIFA Women's World Cup

Summer Olympics

AFC Women's Asian Cup

*Draws include knockout matches decided on penalty kicks.

Asian Games

AFF Women's Championship

Southeast Asian Games

See also

 Sport in Indonesia
 Football in Indonesia
 Women's football in Indonesia
 Indonesia women's national under-20 football team
 Indonesia women's national under-17 football team
 Indonesia women's national futsal team
 Indonesia men's national football team
 Indonesia men's national futsal team
 Indonesia men's national beach soccer team

References

External links
 
 Indonesia on FIFA

Asian women's national association football teams
Women's football in Indonesia